University of South Asia or UNISA is a private university in the Banani Residential Area of Dhaka, Bangladesh. The university was established by the Private University Act of 1992. Its curriculum has been approved by the University Grant Commission of the Government of the People's Republic of Bangladesh.

List of vice-chancellors 

 Prof. Dr. M. A. Wadud Mondal

University of South Asia Business School 

 Bachelor of Business Administration (BBA)

University of South Asia School of Engineering 

 Bachelor of Computer Science & Engineering (BCSE)
 Bachelor of Computer Science & Information Technology (BCSIT)
 Bachelor of Textile Engineering (BTE)

University of South Asia School of Humanities 

 Bachelor of Arts in English Literature & Culture (BAE)
Bachelor of Environmental Science (BES)

University of South Asia School of Public Health and Life Science 

 Bachelor of Environmental Science

University of South Asia Business School (Masters) 

 Masters of Business Administration (MBA)
 Executive Masters of Business Administration (EMBA)
 Master of Bank Management (MBM)

University of South Asia School of Engineering (Masters) 

 Masters of Computer Application (MCA)
 Masters of Computer Science (MCS)

University of South Asia School of Public Health and Life Science (Masters) 

 Masters of Nutrition & Food Science (MNFS)
 Masters of Public Health (MPH)

Diploma programs
 Diploma of Optometry & Low Vision (DOLV) and Diploma of Nutrition &Food Science (DNFS)

References

External links
 Official website
 UGC
 Message From Chairman

Private universities in Bangladesh
Universities and colleges in Dhaka